The PKP class Lyd2 (manufacturer designation L30H) is a narrow gauge diesel-hydraulic locomotive built by FAUR (former 23 August Works) in Romania, for use initially for sugar cane railway in Egypt with later variants developed for use in Poland, Romania and Albania. It was commissioned by Polskie Koleje Państwowe for service on the railways of Poland.

Description
The Lyd2 classification gives the technical details of the locomotives in Polish State Railways (PKP) system. L indicates a narrow gauge locomotive, y indicates 3 axles (0-6-0 or C), d indicates diesel fuel, and finally, 2 indicates hydraulic transmission.

The locomotive is configured with a single cab, with driving positions for both directions. The diesel engine (Maybach MB83B built under licence) produces  though documentation shows a peak rating of 415 bhp from a normally aspirated engine. Transmission occurs by means of hydraulic transmission TH5R-V6. Train braking is via the single pipe air system.

Deployment and usage

Poland
15 locomotives are listed as operative in Poland during 2013. They are split between Białośliwie, Żnin,  Cisna (Bieszczady Forest Railway), Bytom Karb (Lyd2-101 since 2020), Środa Wielkopolska (since 2020), Piaseczno and Koszalin depots. Another 14 locomotives are listed as non-operative.

Outside Poland

Czech Republic
Slezské zemské dráhy, a company which operates passenger trains on narrow gauge railway line Třemešná ve Slezsku – Osoblaha during sommer, purchased in 2005 Lyd2.

Germany
The Zittauer Schmalspurbahn has an Lyd2, numbered 199 013.

The Döllnitzbahn has 2 Lyd2 locomotives, numbered 199 033-2 and 199 034-0 both 1981 built.

St. Kitts
St. Kitts Scenic Railway own three of the class.

United Kingdom
One locomotive (works number 24376) previously at the Great Whipsnade Railway in Bedfordshire has been sold to the South Tynedale Railway.

Three locomotives are based at the Welsh Highland Heritage Railway in Porthmadog PKP numbers 58 & 60 LP Number 08.

References

External links
 The Lyd2 Page
 The Welsh Highland Railway's Lyd2s
 Railfaneurope's stock list for the Zittauer Schmalspurbahn.
 current status of polish Lyd2 (in polish)

0-6-0 locomotives
Diesel locomotives of Poland
FAUR locomotives
600 mm gauge railway locomotives
750 mm gauge locomotives
Metre gauge diesel locomotives
Railway locomotives introduced in 1976